Saint Budoc of Dol (also Budeaux or Beuzec) was a Bishop of Dol, venerated after his death as a saint in both Brittany (now in France) and Devon (now in England). Saint Budoc is the patron of Plourin Ploudalmezeau in Finistère where his relics are preserved. His feast day was celebrated on 8 December, the date still used in Devon, but in Brittany this was moved to 9 December.<ref name=ods>[https://www.oxfordreference.com/view/10.1093/oi/authority.20110803095534102 "Budoc", Oxford Dictionary of Saints]</ref>

Name
The name Budoc, or Beuzec, means "saved from the waters" from the Breton beuziñ meaning "drown"; but Baring-Gould finds this "fanciful". In old Celtic, boudi means "victory" and "profit".

Life
Baring-Gould suggests that the princess Azenor fled Brittany with her young son due to dynastic conflict. Arriving first in Cornwall, they then proceeded to Ireland, where Budoc became a monk. They later returned to Brittany, landing at Porspoder near Brest.

Hagiographer G.H. Doble is of the opinion that Budoc was a once famous abbot whose chief establishment was on the Breton coast. The vita of Breton Saint Winwaloe describes Budoc as a teacher living on the island of Laurea. Later Budoc succeeded Saint Samson and Magloire as bishop of Dol and ruled for 26 years (according to the 10th century vita of Magloire and the 11th century 'Chronicle of Dol'). Baring-Gould distinguishes between the abbot Budoc and the successor to bishop Magloire at Dol.

 Legend 
Budoc is reputed to have been grandson of the King Even of Brest. His mother, Princess Azenor of Brest, had been falsely accused of infidelity by her jealous stepmother, who had thrown the pregnant Azenor into the sea in a cask. (A tower of the Château de Brest is named for her.) Azenor invoked the help of Saint Brigid. The cask drifted for five months. Shortly after Azenor's baby was born, the cask washed ashore on the coast of Ireland. The story echoes Greek myth.

A villager summoned the abbot of Beau Port, near Waterford, and the child was christened the next day.  Azenor became the washer-woman of the monastery, and Budoc was raised there. Azenor's stepmother fell ill, and upon her deathbed she recanted the evil lies she had spread. Azenor's husband sailed in search of Azenor, and arriving in Ireland, the couple was reconciled, but both died before they could return to Brittany. (However, a tradition in Cornouaille has Azenor founding a religious establishment at Cap Sizun).

Budoc became a monk. He eventually left Ireland, sailing in a stone trough that landed at Porspoder.

 Budoc in South-West England 
Budoc is reputed to have sailed across the Plymouth Sound, until he found an inlet on the Devon side of the River Tamar. He landed in Budshead Creek, part of the present district of Plymouth called St Budeaux. His supposed activity suggests the foundation of an early church in Plymouth. However, there is no evidence of the name in Devon prior to the 16th century. There is also an ancient church said to have been dedicated by him at Budock in Cornwall, and there was once one in Oxford too.  Saint Budoc's feast day is celebrated in Devon on 8 December.

 Troparion of Saint Budoc Thou wast miraculously preserved from the ocean's furyand, being sustained by the hand of God,thou didst devote thyself to his service, O Hierarch Budoc.Being showered with both temporal and spiritual honours both in Armagh and in Dol,thou didst labour to win souls for Christ,therefore we implore thine aid,begging Christ our God that he will save our souls''.

Legacy
Two stained-glass windows in the chancel of Saint-Budoc Church in Porspoder depict scenes from the life of the saint.

See also

List of Catholic saints

References

External links
 

6th-century Breton bishops
Bishops of Dol
Southwestern Brythonic saints
6th-century Irish abbots
6th-century Christian saints
Medieval Irish saints
Irish expatriates in France
Medieval Breton saints